KSAU (90.1 FM) is a college radio station, licensed to Nacogdoches, Texas, United States. The station is currently owned by Stephen F. Austin State University.

References

External links

SAU
Stephen F. Austin State University
SAU
Radio stations established in 1956
1956 establishments in Texas